The 1976 Monte Carlo WCT was a combined men's and women's tennis tournament played on outdoor clay courts at the Monte Carlo Country Club in Roquebrune-Cap-Martin, France. The men's tournament was part of the World Championship Tennis (WCT) tour. It was the 71st edition of the event and was held from 13 April through 20 April 1976. Guillermo Vilas and Helga Masthoff won the singles titles.

Finals

Men's singles
 Guillermo Vilas defeated  Wojciech Fibak 6–1, 6-1, 6–4

Women's singles
 Helga Masthoff defeated  Fiorella Bonicelli 6–4, 6-2

Men's doubles
 Karl Meiler /  Wojciech Fibak defeated  Björn Borg /  Guillermo Vilas 7–6, 6–1

Women's doubles
 Katja Ebbinghaus /  Helga Masthoff defeated  Rosie Reyes Darmon /  Gail Lovera 6–3, 7–5

References

External links
 
 ATP tournament profile
 ITF tournament details

Monte-Carlo Masters
Monte Carlo WCT
Monte Carlo WCT
Monte
Monte Carlo WCT